Top Country Albums is a chart that ranks the top-performing country music albums in the United States, published by Billboard.  In 2020, 16 different albums topped the chart, based on multi-metric consumption, blending traditional album sales, track equivalent albums, and streaming equivalent albums.

In the issue of Billboard dated January 4, Burl Ives topped the chart with Rudolph the Red-Nosed Reindeer, the soundtrack album of the 1964 Rankin/Bass television special of the same name.  It was the first number-one country album for Ives, a musician and Academy Award-winning actor who had died in 1995.  It was the first of two posthumous chart-toppers in 2020; Kenny Rogers, who died on March 20, entered the chart at number one in the issue dated April 4 with The Best of Kenny Rogers: Through the Years.  The compilation album was the first number-one country album for Rogers since 1986.  Beginning with the January 11 issue, the number-one position was dominated in 2020 by Luke Combs, who spent 31 weeks in the top spot during the year with his album What You See Is What You Get; no other act spent more than four weeks at number one.  Combs's album also topped the all-genre Billboard 200 albums chart in November following the release of a deluxe edition with additional tracks; in the first week after that release the album set a new streaming record for a country music album.

One act topped the chart for the first time in 2020: Morgan Wallen spent two non-consecutive weeks in the top spot with his debut full-length album If I Know Me.  Two acts each reached number one for the first time since 2006: Jimmy Buffett with Life on the Flip Side and the Chicks with Gaslighter.  The latter album was the all-female trio's first album of new material for fourteen years and their first since they changed their name from the Dixie Chicks.  The year's final chart-topper was the Christmas album My Gift by Carrie Underwood.  Having spent a single week at number one in October, it returned to the peak position in the issue of Billboard dated December 12 and stayed there for the remainder of the year.  It was one of two holiday albums to top the chart in 2020, along with A Holly Dolly Christmas by veteran country star Dolly Parton.

Chart history

See also
2020 in music
List of Billboard number-one country songs of 2020

References

2020
United States Country Albums